The Stovall Mill Covered Bridge is the smallest covered bridge in Georgia. Built in 1895, it is one-lane wide, 33 feet long, and made of wood. It spans Chickamauga Creek in White County and is located near State Route 255.

The bridge is currently owned by the White County Historical Society.  In the past, it served as a link on the Cleveland to Clayton road; but by 1959, the road was moved away from the bridge.  The Stovall Mill Covered Bridge has a variety of other names including the Helen Bridge (for the town of Helen), Chickamauga Bridge, Nacoochee Bridge, and Sautee Bridge.

In popular culture
The Stovall Mill Covered Bridge was featured in the 1951 movie "I'd Climb The Highest Mountain," starring Rory Calhoun, William Lundigan, and Susan Hayward.
This historic covered bridge is said to be haunted. If you stand inside the bridge alone at night, you are supposed to hear the cries of unseen babies and the sounds of horse-drawn carriages. The bridge is a local landmark and open to the public.

See also
List of covered bridges in Georgia

External links 
Georgia DOT web page for Stovall Bridge
Roadside Georgia web page for Stovall Bridge
About north Georgia covered bridges
Peach State Roads - Ga 255
Stovall Mill Bridge photos
Stovall Mill Bridge historic marker photos

Buildings and structures in White County, Georgia
Covered bridges in Georgia (U.S. state)
Bridges completed in 1895
Wooden bridges in Georgia (U.S. state)
Road bridges in Georgia (U.S. state)
Transportation in White County, Georgia
Tourist attractions in White County, Georgia